Kalaiyar Kovil is a historic temple in Sivaganga District, Tamil Nadu, India.

Location 

Name of temple 
Kalaiyar Kovil  derived its name from the Kaleeswarar temple of the place. Kalaiyar is a corruption of the word Kaleeswaran. During the Sangam period, this place was known as Kaanapair as can be seen from the 21st verse in the purananooru sung by Iyur moolakizhar, a poet of the Sangam period. In the ninth century A.D. Saint Sundara moorthy nayanar described the presiding deity in his devotional songs as Kaalai. Since then the deity was known as Kalaiyar, with the Tamil sufix yar added to it denoting respect. The temple came to be known as Kalaiyar Kovil and this was later adapted to the place also. It is one of the shrines of the 275 Paadal Petra Sthalams.

Temple structure
A lofty Rajagopuram and an imposing Teppakkulam tank (with a mandapam) named Aanai madu adorn this shrine. Airavatam the elephant of Indra is said to have created this tank. There are three shrines in this temple associated with the three functions of creation, preservation and completion. The presiding deity Lord shiva is called as Kaaleeshwarar, Someshwarar, Sundareshwarar and the Ambal his consort mother Parvati is called as Swarnambikai, Soundara Nayaki, Meenakshi. Additional to that there are three separate shrines for both the male and female deities of famous Shiva temples in a mandapam outside the shrine.

Seat of kings 
Kalaiyarkoil was the seat of the kings from very early days. King Vengai Marban ruled over this area during Sangam period. It was the stronghold of rulers of Sivangangai. It was also the seat of the freedom fighters like Muthu Vatuka Natha Thevar and Maruthu brothers.

Legend 
KaliDevi fought against chandasuran at kalayarkovil. She prayed the kaleeswarar lingam and joined hands with saptha mathargal and won the battle. That is why the place is named as kalipuram.

History 
On 25 June 1772, the Company forces under Col. Joseph Smitt and Cap. Bonjour marched towards Kalayar Kovil. The second king of Sivaganga, Muthu Vaduga Natha Thevar (1750–1772) and Maruthu brothers defended it. Rajah Muthu Vaduganatha Thevar in anticipation of the English invasion made preparation for defence. But Rajah Muthu Vaduganatha Thevar with the many of his soldiers fell dead in the kalaiyarkoil battle. The invading English forces plundered Kalaiyarkoil and collected jewels worth 50,000 pagodas. Statue of Chief commander of Maruthu Pandiyar forces Udhaya Perumal Gounder who died in the war is also installed in the temple premises. Kalaiyarkoil temple belongs to Sivagangai Devasthanam.

Festivals
Kaaleesar's festival is celebrated in the month of Thai where the car festival is observed during the Poosam. Someswarar's Bhrammotsavam is celebrated in the Tamil month of Vaikasi. the float festival also happens then. Aadi Pooram is celebrated for Swarnavalli amman.

See also 
 Maruthu Pandiyar
 Madurai district
 Sivaganga
 Hindu temple
 Devakottai

References
http://www.thevaaram.org/thirumurai_1/koil_view.php?koil_idField=95

External links

Wikimapia
 https://web.archive.org/web/20090525164047/http://www.shivatemples.com/pnaadu/pn10.html
 http://www.templenet.com/Tamilnadu/s091.html
 http://www.kalaiyarkovil.com
Kalaiyar Kovil Kaleeswarar Temple at Kalayarkovil, Sivaganga District – one of the famous 14 Lord Shiva Temples in Pandiya Kingdom – Visit, Travel Guide

Hindu temples in Sivaganga district
Tourist attractions in Madurai
Padal Petra Stalam
Cities and towns in Sivaganga district